Anson County Airport  is a public airport located three miles (5 km) north of the central business district of Wadesboro, a town in Anson County, North Carolina, United States. It is owned by Anson County.

Although most U.S. airports use the same three-letter location identifier for the FAA and IATA, Anson County Airport is assigned AFP by the FAA but has no designation from the IATA.

Facilities and aircraft 
For the 12-month period ending August 3, 2005, the airport had 7,200 aircraft operations, an average of 19 per day: 90% general aviation, 7% air taxi and 3% military. There are 32 aircraft based at this airport: 66% single engine, 25% ultralight, 6% multi-engine and 3% gliders.

History 
The Anson County Airport was originally equipped with a runway only . long. In 2006, a new . runway was completed, in addition to a new . terminal building and several new hangars.  Future plans for the airport include the addition of a new Instrument Landing System.

References

External links 
 Anson County Airport (official page)
  at North Carolina DOT airport guide

Airports in North Carolina
Buildings and structures in Anson County, North Carolina
North Carolina
Transportation in Anson County, North Carolina